This is a listing of all the animated shorts released by Warner Bros. under the Looney Tunes and Merrie Melodies banners between 1950 and 1959.

A total of 278 shorts were released during the 1950s.

1950 
Starting this year, all cartoons are in Technicolor.

1951 
With the exceptions of Hare We Go, Rabbit Every Monday, and The Fair-Haired Hare (all Bugs Bunny cartoons), every other cartoon released by the studio this year ultimately received Blue Ribbon reissues.

1952

1953

1954 

±

1955

1956

1957

1958

1959

See also 
 Looney Tunes
 Merrie Melodies
 Looney Tunes Golden Collection

Notes

Further reading 
 Looney Tunes and Merrie Melodies: A Complete Illustrated Guide to the Warner Bros. Cartoons, by Jerry Beck and Will Friedwald (1989), Henry Holt, 
 Chuck Amuck : The Life and Times of an Animated Cartoonist by Chuck Jones, published by Farrar, Straus & Giroux, 
 That's Not All, Folks! by Mel Blanc, Philip Bashe. Warner Books,  (Softcover)  (Hardcover)
 Of Mice and Magic: A History of American Animated Cartoons, Leonard Maltin, Revised Edition 1987, Plume  (Softcover)  (Hardcover)

External links 
 Official Looney Tunes site
 The Big Cartoon DataBase entry for Merrie Melodies Cartoons and for Looney Tunes Cartoons
 Golden Age Cartoons' The Ultimate Looney Tunes and Merrie Melodies Website by Jon Cooke
 "Warner Brothers Cartoon Companion", a wealth of trivia about the Warner cartoons

1950s in American cinema
 
 
Warner Bros. Cartoons